South Carolina Highway 164 (SC 164) is a  state highway in the U.S. state of South Carolina. Most of the highway travels through Hollywood and acts as a shortcut between Hollywood and Edisto Beach.

Route description
SC 164 begins at an intersection with SC 174 west-southwest of Hollywood, within Charleston County, where the roadway continues as Willtown Road. It travels to the northeast as a two-lane road with a  speed limit. It enters the city limits of Hollywood. After a short distance, SC 164 meets its eastern terminus, an intersection with SC 162.

Major intersections

See also

References

External links

SC 164 South Carolina Hwy Index

164
Transportation in Charleston County, South Carolina